
Year 52 BC was a year of the pre-Julian Roman calendar. At the time, it was known as the Year of the Consulship of Pompeius and Scipio (or, less frequently, year 702 Ab urbe condita). The denomination 52 BC for this year has been used since the early medieval period, when the Anno Domini calendar era became the prevalent method in Europe for naming years.

Events 
 By place 

 Roman Republic 
 Consuls: Quintus Caecilius Metellus Pius Scipio Nasica and Gnaeus Pompeius Magnus.
 Gnaeus Pompeius marries Cornelia Metella.
 Milo is tried for the murder of Clodius. Despite Cicero's legal defence (Pro Milone) he is found guilty and exiled in Massilia (modern Marseille).
 Last year of Julius Caesar's Gallic Wars:
 March – Siege and capture of Avaricum (Bourges).
 April–May – Siege and repulse from Gergovia.
 July – Battle of the Vingeanne: Julius Caesar rebuffs, with his German auxiliaries, a Gallic cavalry attack of Vercingetorix.
 Summer – Siege of Alesia: Julius Caesar spreads out his legions around the Oppidum and builds a string of fortifications surrounding the stronghold of Alesia. 
 September – Battle of Alesia: Julius Caesar defeats the Gallic allies coming to aid Vercingetorix, led by his cousin Vercassivellanus. Vercingetorix surrenders on October 3, signalling the Roman conquest of Gaul. The final pacification of Gaul is completed the following year.
 Winter – Julius Caesar crosses Mons Cevenna (central Gaul) and sends  his army through the passes covered with snowdrifts to take the rebellious Arverni by surprise.

Births 
 Fenestella, Roman historian (approximate date)
 Juba II, king of Numidia (d. AD 23)

Deaths 
 January 18 – Publius Clodius Pulcher, murdered on the Appian Way by Titus Annius Milo (b. 93 BC)
 Cyrus, Roman architect (builder for Cicero)
 Sedullos, Gaulish chieftain (b.87 BC)
 Surena, Parthian general (b. 84 BC)

References